Torwali or Turvali may refer to:
 Torwali language spoken in Khyber Pakhtunkhwa
 Torwali people, who speak the language

Language and nationality disambiguation pages